An earthmover is a heavy-duty vehicle.

Earthmover or Earth Mover may also refer to:
 Earth Mover, a 2006 album by Cosmic Gate
 Earthmover, a 2007 EP by Once Nothing
 Earthmover (character), a character from Batman Beyond
 "Earth Mover" (Batman Beyond), a 1999 episode of Batman Beyond